Emyr Lewis (born 29 August 1968) is a former Wales international rugby union player. He attained 41 caps for Wales between 1991 and 1996. He also captained the national team.

Lewis was born in Carmarthen.  A flanker, he played his club rugby for Cardiff RFC, but played his best rugby for Llanelli RFC and Carmarthen Athletic.

After retiring from rugby, Lewis has found work as a salesman for various photocopying companies, currently for Midshire Business Systems. Lewis also commentates for the BBC and S4C broadcasting companies.

Notes

Welsh rugby union players
Wales international rugby union players
Wales rugby union captains
Cardiff RFC players
Llanelli RFC players
1968 births
Living people
Rugby union players from Carmarthen
Rugby union number eights